Longinówka  is a village in the administrative district of Gmina Rozprza, within Piotrków County, Łódź Voivodeship, in central Poland.

The village has a population of 554.

History
During the joint German-Soviet invasion of Poland, which started World War II in September 1939, the Germans locked up several captured Polish prisoners of war in a house in the village, then set it on fire and burned the Poles alive (see also Nazi crimes against the Polish nation).

References

Villages in Piotrków County
Nazi war crimes in Poland
World War II prisoner of war massacres by Nazi Germany